"Sideways" is a song co-written and recorded by American country music artist Dierks Bentley. It was released on March 2, 2009, as the second single from his 2009 album Feel That Fire and as the twelfth single of his career. On the chart week of July 11, 2009, the song became Bentley's seventh Number One hit on the U.S. Billboard Hot Country Songs chart.

Content
"Sideways" was co-written by Bentley himself, along with Jim Beavers, the brother of Bentley's producer, Brett Beavers. This song is a up-tempo backed mainly by electric guitar and by banjo. The song is about the male character's attempt to talk to a female in a bar. Despite not being able to hear her name because of the loud noise, he still tries to come on to her, saying that he wants to "get a little sideways" with her. The song's final chorus features the ambient noise of a bar, along with a chanted chorus by backing vocalists.

Music video
The music video was directed by Michael Salomon, and features Bentley singing in front of a large party crowd. The video was #50 on the GAC's Top 50 Videos of the Year list. It was shot inside the Fuse nightclub, located inside the Gaylord Opryland Resort & Convention Center.

A second video, containing live performance footage, was released in August 2009. This is the most commonly used version on TV.

Critical reception
Kevin J. Coyne of Country Universe gave the song a C rating and thought that Bentley sounded uncomfortable singing the song, making it sound "dull and lifeless" as a result.

Popular culture
The song was used and mixed by the dance crew Southern Movement, hailing from Nashville, Tennessee, during the first week and premiere of the fourth season of America's Best Dance Crew.
"Sideways" was used with rewritten lyrics as a theme song for NASCAR on Fox at the very beginning of the pre-race show starting in the 2011 and the 2012 Sprint Cup Series seasons. In 2013, NASCAR on Fox returned to using the NFL on Fox theme.

Chart and sales performance

Year-end charts

Certifications

References

2009 singles
Dierks Bentley songs
Music videos directed by Michael Salomon
Songs written by Dierks Bentley
Songs written by Jim Beavers
Capitol Records Nashville singles
Song recordings produced by Brett Beavers
2009 songs